The phrase "the empire on which the sun never sets" was used to describe certain global empires that were so extensive that it seemed as though it was always daytime in at least one part of its territory.

The concept of an empire ruling all lands where the sun shines dates back to the ancient Egyptians,  Mesopotamians, Persians, and Romans. In its modern form, it was first used for the Habsburg Empire of Charles V, who, as Duke of Burgundy, King of Spain, Archduke of Austria, and Holy Roman Emperor, attempted to build a universal monarchy. The term was then used for the Spanish Empire of Philip II of Spain and successors when the empire reached a global territorial size, particularly in the 16th, 17th and 18th centuries. It was used for the British Empire, mainly in the 19th and early 20th centuries, a period in which it reached a global territorial size. In the 20th century, the phrase has sometimes been adapted to refer to the global reach of American power.

Ancient precursors

Mesopotamian texts contemporary to Sargon of Akkad (c. 2334 – 2279 BC) proclaim that this king ruled "all the lands from sunrise to sunset", and the Story of Sinuhe (19th century BC) announces that the Egyptian king rules "all what the sun encircles". Georg Büchmann traces the idea to a speech in Herodotus' Histories, attributed by Xerxes I before invading Greece.γῆν τὴν Περσίδα ἀποδέξομεν τῷ Διὸς αἰθέρι ὁμουρέουσαν. οὐ γὰρ δὴ χώρην γε οὐδεμίαν κατόψεται ἥλιος ὅμουρον ἐοῦσαν τῇ ἡμετέρῃ
"We shall extend the Persian territory as far as God's heaven reaches. The sun will then shine on no land beyond our borders."

The Roman Empire was also described in classical Latin literature as extending "from the rising to the setting sun".

Habsburg Empire of Charles V 

Charles V of the House of Habsburg controlled in personal union a composite monarchy inclusive of the Holy Roman Empire stretching from Germany to Northern Italy with direct rule over the Low Countries and Austria, and Spain with its southern Italian kingdoms of Sicily, Sardinia and Naples. He oversaw both the continuation of the long-lasting Spanish colonization of the Americas and the short-lived German colonization of the Americas. Historian Anthony Pagden cites Ariosto as the source for the use of the phrase "empire on which the sun never sets" to refer to Charles V's empire.

Spanish Empire

Charles's son, Philip II of Spain, made Spain (his homeland) the metropole of the territories that he inherited. In particular, he placed the Council of Castille, the Council of Aragon, the Council of Italy, the Council of Flanders and the Council of the Indies in Madrid. He added the Philippines (named after him) to his colonial territories.  When King Henry of Portugal died, Philip II pressed his claim to the Portuguese throne and was recognised as Philip I of Portugal in 1581. The Portuguese Empire, now ruled by Philip, itself included territories in the Americas, in the North and the Sub-Saharan Africa, in all the Asian Subcontinents, and islands in the Atlantic, Indian and Pacific oceans.

In 1585, Giovanni Battista Guarini wrote Il pastor fido to mark the marriage of Catherine Michelle, daughter of Philip II, to Charles Emmanuel I, Duke of Savoy. Guarini's dedication read, "Altera figlia / Di qel Monarca, a cui / Nö anco, quando annotta, il Sol tramonta." ("The proud daughter / of that monarch to whom / when it grows dark [elsewhere] the sun never sets.").

In the early 17th century, the phrase was familiar to John Smith and to Francis Bacon, who writes: "both the East and the West Indies being met in the crown of Spain, it is come to pass, that, as one saith in a brave kind of expression, the sun never sets in the Spanish dominions, but ever shines upon one part or other of them: which, to say truly, is a beam of glory [...]". Thomas Urquhart wrote of "that great Don Philippe, Tetrarch of the world, upon whose subjects the sun never sets."

In the German dramatist Friedrich Schiller's 1787 play Don Carlos, Don Carlos's father, Philip II, says, "Ich heiße / der reichste Mann in der getauften Welt; / Die Sonne geht in meinem Staat nicht unter." ("I am called / The richest monarch in the Christian world; / The sun in my dominion never sets.").

Joseph Fouché recalled Napoleon saying before the Peninsular War, "Reflect that the sun never sets in the immense inheritance of Charles V, and that I shall have the empire of both worlds." This was cited in Walter Scott's Life of Napoleon.

It has been claimed that Louis XIV of France's emblem of the "Sun King" and associated motto, "Nec pluribus impar", were based on the solar emblem and motto of Philip II.

British Empire 

In the 19th century, it became popular to apply the phrase to the British Empire. It was a time when British world maps showed the Empire in red and pink to highlight British imperial power spanning the globe. Scottish author, John Wilson, writing as "Christopher North" in Blackwood's Magazine in 1829, is sometimes credited as originating the usage. However, George Macartney wrote in 1773, in the wake of the territorial expansion that followed Britain's victory in the Seven Years' War, of "this vast empire on which the sun never sets, and whose bounds nature has not yet ascertained."

In a speech on 31 July 1827, Rev. R. P. Buddicom said, "It had been said that the sun never set on the British flag; it was certainly an old saying, about the time of Richard the Second, and was not so applicable then as at the present time." In 1821, the Caledonian Mercury wrote of the British Empire, "On her dominions the sun never sets; before his evening rays leave the spires of Quebec, his morning beams have shone three hours on Port Jackson, and while sinking from the waters of Lake Superior, his eye opens upon the Mouth of the Ganges."

Daniel Webster famously expressed a similar idea in 1834: "A power which has dotted over the surface of the whole globe with her possessions and military posts, whose morning drumbeat, following the sun and keeping company with the hours, circles the earth with one continuous and unbroken strain of the martial airs of England." In 1839, Sir Henry Ward said in the House of Commons, "Look at the British Colonial empire—the most magnificent empire that the world ever saw. The old Spanish boast that the sun never set in their dominions, has been more truly realised amongst ourselves." By 1861, Lord Salisbury complained that the £1.5 million spent on colonial defence by Britain merely enabled the nation "to furnish an agreeable variety of stations to our soldiers, and to indulge in the sentiment that the sun never sets on our Empire".

A rejoinder, sometimes attributed to John Duncan Spaeth, runs in one variant, "The sun never set on the British Empire, because even God couldn't trust the English in the dark".

United States 

From the mid-nineteenth century, the image of the sun never setting can be found applied to Anglophone culture, explicitly including both the British Empire and the United States, for example in a speech by Alexander Campbell in 1852: "To Britain and America God has granted the possession of the new world; and because the sun never sets upon our religion, our language and our arts...".

By the end of the century, the phrase was also being applied to the United States alone. An 1897 magazine article titled "The Greatest Nation on Earth" boasted, "[T]he sun never sets on Uncle Sam". In 1906, William Jennings Bryan wrote, "If we can not boast that the sun never sets on American territory, we can find satisfaction in the fact that the sun never sets on American philanthropy"; after which, The New York Times received letters attempting to disprove his presupposition. In the course of the 20th century, the metaphor of the sun never setting was used systematically, together with empire allusions such as Pax Americana, in the rhetoric of US foreign policy. 
A 1991 history book discussion of U.S. expansion states, "Today ... the sun never sets on American territory, properties owned by the U.S. government and its citizens, American armed forces abroad, or countries that conduct their affairs within limits largely defined by American power."

Although most of these sentiments have a patriotic ring, the phrase is sometimes used critically with the implication of American imperialism, as in the title of Joseph Gerson's book, The Sun Never Sets: Confronting the Network of Foreign U.S. Military Bases.

See also 
King of Kings
List of former transcontinental countries
Nec pluribus impar
Pluricontinentalism
Plus ultra

References 

Spanish Empire
British Empire
Phrases
Imperialism
Spanish Renaissance
History of United States expansionism
Geopolitical terminology
16th-century neologisms